Tuttorqortooq Island (old spelling: Tugtorqortôq) is an uninhabited island in Avannaata municipality in northwestern Greenland.

Geography 
Tuttorqortooq Island is located in Tasiusaq Bay, in the north-central part of Upernavik Archipelago, at the mouth of Kangerlussuaq Icefjord, which separates it from Mernoq Island in the northeast. In the east, the northern tip of Qallunaat Island is separated from Tuttorqortooq by the narrow Qaqqakassaup Ikerasaa strait, widening into a bay to the southwest between the two islands. To the west, a small, rocky Horse Head Island buffers the island from the open waters of Baffin Bay. The island is mountainous, with an unnamed  peak in the central-western part of the island.

Promontories

References 

Uninhabited islands of Greenland
Tasiusaq Bay
Islands of the Upernavik Archipelago